Patriarch Stephen of Constantinople may refer to:

 Stephen I of Constantinople, Ecumenical Patriarch of Constantinople in 886–893
 Stephen II of Constantinople, Ecumenical Patriarch of Constantinople in 925–928